Săvești may refer to several villages in Romania:

 Săvești, a village in Braniștea Commune, Dâmbovița County
 Săvești, a village in Răucești Commune, Neamț County

See also 
 Sava (disambiguation)
 Savu (disambiguation)